Napier City Council is the territorial authority of Napier, Hawke's Bay Region, New Zealand.

Councillors

Ahuriri Ward
The Ahuriri Ward covers 36.19 km2 area of northern suburbs.

It is currently represented by Haley Browne and Keith Price.

Onekawa-Tamatea Ward
The Onekawa-Tamatea Ward covers a 5.65 km2 area of central suburbs.

It is currently represented by Richard McGrath and Annette Brosnan.

Nelson Park Ward
The Nelson Park Ward covers a 7.59 km2 area of coastal suburbs.

It is currently represented by Maxine Boag, Apiata Tapine, Sally Crown and Greg Mawson.

Taradale Ward
The Taradale Ward covers 55.62 km2 area, west and south of the main city.

It is currently represented by Ronda Chrystal, Tania Wright, Nigel Simpson and Graeme Taylor.

Committees

Standing committees
Napier City Council has four standing committees, made up of the 13 elected councillors:

Napier People and Places Committee
Prosperous Napier Committee
Sustainable Napier Committee
Future Napier Committee

Specialist committees
The council also has several specialist committees:

Māori Committee, consisting of the mayor and five iwi representatives
Hearings Committee, consisting of five councillors
Audit and Risk Committee, consisting of five councillors and two external independent appointee
Chief Executive Contract Committee, consisting of five councillors
District Licensing Committee, consisting of an external commissioner and four list members

Advisory panels
The council has two sub-committees and advisory panels:

Grants Sub-Committee, consisting of two councillors and four community representatives
Arts Advisory Committee, consisting of one councilor and five arts representatives

Joint committees
The council also participates in several joint committees:

Clifton to Tangoio Coastal Hazards Strategy Joint Committee
Hawke’s Bay Civil Defence Emergency Management Joint Committee
Hawke’s Bay Drinking Water Joint Committee
Hawke’s Bay Regional Transport Committee
Heretaunga Plains Urban Development Strategy Implementation Working Party
Joint Alcohol Strategy Advisory Group
Joint Waste Futures Project Steering Committee
Omarunui Joint Refuse Landfill Committee
Regional Cycling Governance Group
Te Komiti Muriwai o Te Whanga

Council Controlled Organisations
The council is involved in three council-controlled organisations:

Hawke’s Bay Museums Trust
Omarunui Landfill
Hawke's Bay Airport

References

Napier, New Zealand
City councils in New Zealand
Politics of the Hawke's Bay Region